Rhythm-Time: World Percussion is a world music compilation album originally released in 1999. Part of the World Music Network Rough Guides series, the release features percussion, ranging from Brazilian batucada to Japanese taiko music. The compilation was produced by Phil Stanton, co-founder of the World Music Network, in partnership with New Internationalist magazine.

Countries represented in this compilation include South Africa, Cuba, Ghana, Zimbabwe, Brazil, Senegal, The Gambia, Egypt, Morocco, Italy, Nigeria, India and Japan.

Critical reception

Tom Schulte of AllMusic called the package "unassuming" and the tracks a "veritable treasure of world music rhythms".

Track listing

References

External links
 

1999 compilation albums
World Music Network Rough Guide albums